V. Vaithilingam (born 5 October 1950) is an Indian politician, belonging to Indian National Congress, who currently represents Puducherry in the Lok Sabha. He held the position as 11th Chief Minister of Pondicherry from 1991 to 1996 and 6th Chief Minister of Puducherry again from 2008 to 2011. He is a senior legislator serving eight consecutive terms.

He is known for the family politics in Pondicherry. His paternal grandfather late Vaithilingam Reddiar was the Mayor of Nettappakkam commune during the French rule in Puducherry and his father V. Venkatasubha Reddiar was also a Chief Minister of Pondicherry. He headed the Pondicherry Government from 1991 to 1996 and the Congress Legislative party from 1991 to 2000. His priorities as Chief Minister were to minimize the budget deficit, increase private sector participation in public transport, improve health care system. He became Chief Minister at the age of 40.

Early life 

He was born at Cuddalore and was raised in his native home Madukarai, Puducherry. After completing his schooling, he went to Loyola College in Chennai and later went to Madukkarai to take care of his family farms. In 1969, Vaithilingam married Miss Sasikala. From an early age, he developed exceptional leadership skills, an example of which was his role as the Chairman of Land Development Bank of Puducherry State.

Political career 

In 1980, at the age of 30, he ran for the Legislative Assembly and lost by a narrow margin of 90 odd votes. In 1985, Vaithilingam won to become Public Works and Power Minister. He became familiar among the Congress Party members. From 1991 to 1996 he served as the Chief minister of Pondicherry. Under his administration, Pondicherry saw a drastic growth in the industrial and education sector. He advocated smaller government and greater participation of private sector. Vaithilingam also benefited from the management of the economy and the liberalization policies followed by Prime Minister 
P. V. Narasimha Rao. In 1996 elections Indian National Congress became the single largest party, but their alliance lost the elections and he was appointed the leader of opposition till 1999. In 2001 he won from Nettappakkam constituency but was not able to become chief minister because Vaithilingam was charged with an attempt to corrupt a fellow legislator and lost his congress leadership. N. Rangaswamy was chosen as chief minister and he served as an M.L.A. in his cabinet till 2006. In 2006 he served as the minister of agriculture and industries till 2008. He was made the Chief minister in 2008 and he served till 2011. He became leader of opposition in 2011 election and he became speaker of the house in 2016 and resigned in 2019 after becoming member of parliament, Puducherry.

In the 2019 Lok Sabha elections V. Vaithilingam was chosen to represent Indian National Congress party and he defeated All India N.R. Congress candidate Dr. Narayanasamy Kesavan (see Puducherry (Lok Sabha constituency)).

Electoral history
Member of the Legislative Assembly

Member of Parliament

Comeback 
Vaithilingam was charged with an attempt to corrupt a fellow legislator. Although he was found not guilty and acquitted on all charges, Vaithilingam lost his leadership of the Congress Legislative party in 2000. He was for the sixth time elected to the legislature and served as Industries and Power Minister in N.Rangaswamy cabinet in 2006.

Positions Held

|-

|-

|-

|-

References

External links

1950 births
Indian National Congress politicians from Puducherry
Chief ministers of Puducherry
Living people
Leaders of the Opposition in Puducherry
People from Cuddalore district
Chief ministers from Indian National Congress
People from Pondicherry
State cabinet ministers of Puducherry
Puducherry politicians
Speakers of Puducherry Legislative Assembly
India MPs 2019–present
Puducherry MLAs 2016–2021
Puducherry MLAs 1985–1990
Puducherry MLAs 1990–1991
Puducherry MLAs 1991–1996
Puducherry MLAs 1996–2001
Puducherry MLAs 2001–2006
Puducherry MLAs 2006–2011
Puducherry MLAs 2011–2016